Fabio Enrique Parra Pinto (born November 22, 1959 in Sogamoso, Boyacá) is a retired Colombian road racing cyclist. Parra was successful as an amateur in Colombia, winning the Novatos classification for new riders or riders riding their first edition of the race, and finishing 14th in the 1979 Vuelta a Colombia and then the General classification in the 1981 Vuelta a Colombia. He also competed in the individual road race event at the 1984 Summer Olympics.

Parra turned professional for the first Colombian cycling team, Café de Colombia, in 1985. He was a professional from 1985 to 1992 and won stages in the Tour de France and Vuelta a España. His success occurred at the same time as his compatriot Luis Herrera. While Herrera won stages and the King of the Mountains competitions in the grand tours, Parra could contend for the overall classification. His greatest achievements were a third place in the 1988 Tour de France, highest placing of a South American for 25 years, until his countryman Nairo Quintana finished second in the 2013 Tour de France, and, in the following year in the Vuelta a España, finishing second to Pedro Delgado at 35 seconds.

Fabio Parra has two younger brothers who also became professionals, Humberto Parra Pinto and Iván Parra. Humberto rode for three years for Kelme while Iván won 2 stages of the 2005 Giro d'Italia.

Career achievements

Major results

1979
1st Novatos New rider classification, Vuelta a Colombia
1980
9th Overall Vuelta a Colombia
1981
1st  Overall Vuelta a Colombia
2nd Overall Clásico RCN
1982
2nd Overall Clásico RCN
1984
3rd Overall Vuelta a Colombia
5th Overall Clásico RCN
1985
2nd Overall Vuelta a Colombia
1st Stage 11
5th Overall Vuelta a España
8th Overall Tour de France
 Young rider classification
1st Stage 12
1986
8th Overall Vuelta a España
1987
1st  Overall Clásico RCN
1st Stages 1 & 6
3rd Overall Tour de Suisse
6th Overall Tour de France
1988
 3rd Overall Tour de France
 1st Stage 11
4th Overall Vuelta a Colombia
5th Overall Vuelta a España
 1st Stage 13
1989
2nd Overall Vuelta a España
2nd Overall Clásico RCN
1st Stage 3
2nd Overall Vuelta a Colombia
1st Stage 10
1990
5th Overall Vuelta a España
5th Overall Critérium du Dauphiné Libéré
1991
5th Overall Vuelta a España
1st Stage 13
6th Overall Vuelta a Colombia
8th GP Cafe de Colombia
1992
1st  Overall Vuelta a Colombia
1st Stage 11
7th Overall Vuelta a España

Grand Tour general classification results timeline

References

External links

Fabio Parra results and teams

1959 births
Living people
People from Sogamoso
Colombian Tour de France stage winners
Colombian male cyclists
Vuelta a Colombia stage winners
Olympic cyclists of Colombia
Cyclists at the 1984 Summer Olympics
Colombian Vuelta a España stage winners
Sportspeople from Boyacá Department